The 1907 Massachusetts Aggies football team represented Massachusetts Agricultural College in the 1907 college football season. The team was coached by Matthew W. Bullock and played its home games at Alumni Field in Amherst, Massachusetts. The 1907 season marked Bullock's return to the Aggies, as he had previously coached the team during the 1904 season. Massachusetts finished the season with a record of 5–3–1.

Schedule

References

Massachusetts
UMass Minutemen football seasons
Massachusetts Aggies football